Firing Line may refer to:

Firing Line (TV program), American television series
Firing Line (horse), American racehorse
Firing Line: Cardiff Castle Museum of the Welsh Soldier, museum in Cardiff Castle, Cardiff, Wales, United Kingdom
The Firing Line, a lost 1919 American silent film

See also
Fire line
Escanaba Firing Line